Angels with Even Filthier Souls may refer to:

 Angels with Even Filthier Souls, a fictional black-and-white gangster meta-film from Home Alone 2: Lost in New York
 "Angels with Even Filthier Souls", a song from the album From Ohio with Love by the band A Day in the Life
 "Angels with Even Filthier Souls", a song from the 2005 Elektra: The Album soundtrack, by the same group, now called Hawthorne Heights